The Haiti leaf-toed gecko (Phyllodactylus sommeri) is a species of gecko. It is endemic to Haiti.

References

Phyllodactylus
Reptiles of Haiti
Reptiles described in 1979